The 1895 Kentucky gubernatorial election was held on November 5, 1895. Republican nominee William O'Connell Bradley defeated Democratic nominee Parker Watkins Hardin with 48.29% of the vote.

General election

Candidates
Major party candidates
William O'Connell Bradley, Republican 
Parker Watkins Hardin, Democratic

Other candidates
Thomas S. Petit, People's
T.P. Demaree, Prohibition

Results

References

1895
Kentucky
Gubernatorial
November 1895 events